The International Association for Philosophy and Literature (IAPL), founded in 1976 by Hugh J. Silverman, brought together thinkers and scholars working in a wide range of disciplines concerned with the study of philosophical, historical, critical, and theoretical issues. The IAPL was dedicated to the exchange of ideas and to the enhancement of scholarly research in the arts and the humanities. The IAPL provided an opportunity to engage in discussion at the intersections of philosophical, literary, cultural, textual, visual, medial, art, and aesthetic theories. With its focus on interdisciplinary topics and commitments, the IAPL played a role in the articulation of vital and exciting recent developments in philosophy, literature, and the arts.

Since Hugh J. Silverman's death in 2013* Obituary, the IAPL has continued as an organization and has published volumes related to previous conferences but has refrained from organizing conferences. In 2018 the IAPL relaunched as The Association for Philosophy and Literature and has started with a new series of annual conferences.

Annual Conferences 

Annual APL conferences provide opportunities for dialogue and strategic readings, the articulation of contemporary themes and ideas, the exploration of various expressive arts, and the production of new theoretical discourses.

Recent conference themes and locations include:
(2019) Truth Fiction Illusion – Worlds and Experience (1st conference as APL) University of Klagenfurt (Austria)
(2013) Hospitalities: biopolitics / technologies / humanities (37th annual conference) National University of Singapore
(2009) Double Edges: rhetorics-rhizomes-regions (33rd annual conference) Brunel University
(2008) Global Arts / Local Knowledge  (32nd annual conference) RMIT University, La Trobe University, University of Melbourne (Australia)
(2007) Layering: Spatial / Temporal / Textual / Visual (31st annual conference) University of Cyprus, Nicosia (Cyprus)
(2006) Between Three: Arts - Media - Politics (30th annual conference) University of Freiburg (Germany), University of Strasbourg (France), Beyeler Foundation (Basel, Switzerland)
(2005) Chiasmatic Encounters (29th annual conference) University of Helsinki (Finland)

Some past keynote or plenary speakers have included: Rosi Braidotti, Pheng Cheah, Jacques Derrida, Steve Dixon, Peter Eisenman, Frank Gehry, Peter Greenaway, Sneja Gunew, Steven Holl, Dominique Janicaud, Alphonso Lingis, Mario Perniola, Jacques Rancière, Stelarc, Slavoj Žižek

Membership

Membership in the APL includes access to conference programs, special discounts on conference registration fees and at conference hotels, receipt of various APL brochures and publications, the Bibliography of Books Published by APL Members, the opportunity to submit a conference paper, and the support of an extensive range of useful information made available on the APL website. Membership also includes a free book from the ongoing Textures series consisting of uniquely focused volumes of essays derived from previous IAPL/APL
conferences.

Publications

The IAPL in concert with established publishers produces volumes resulting from its annual conferences.  These books are fully edited, shaped, and recast as in-depth studies of a given topic with some of the major contributors to a particular IAPL conference.
Essays are selected for their development of aspects of the volume theme and for lasting value. The Textures: Philosophy / Literature / Culture Series was edited by Hugh J. Silverman, IAPL Executive Editor. The role of Executive Editor has been taken over by John W P Phillips since 2013. Each volume is edited typically by the conference host coordinator(s).  Members can select one of the current volumes as part of their membership benefits each year.

Recent volumes include:

Chiasmatic Encounters: Art, Ethics, Politics. Edited by Kuisma Korhonen, Arto Haarpala, Sara Heinämaa, Kristian Klockars, and Pajari Räsänen (Lanham, MD: Lexington, 2018).
Textual Layering: Contact, Historicity, Critique. Edited by Maria Margaroni, Apostolos Lampropoulos, and Christos Hadjichristos (Lanham, MD: Lexington, 2017).
De-signing Design: Cartographies of Theory and Practice. Edited by Elizabeth Grierson, Harriet Edquist, and Hélène Frichot (Lanham, MD: Lexington, 2016)
Intermedialities: Philosophy, Arts, Politics. Edited by Henk Oosterling and Ewa Plonowska Ziarek (Lanham, MD: Lexington Books, 2010). Dramas of Culture. Edited by Wayne J. Froman and John Burt Foster Jr. (Lanham, MD: Lexington Books, 2008).
Between Philosophy and Poetry: Writing, Rhythm, History. Edited by Massimo Verdicchio and Robert Burch (London and New York: Continuum Books, 2003).
Panorama: Philosophies of the Visible. Edited by Wilhelm S. Wurzer (London and New York: Continuum Books, 2003).
Thresholds of Western Culture: Identity, Postcoloniality, Transnationalism. Edited by John Burt Foster Jr. and Wayne J.  Froman (London and New York: Continuum Books, 2003).
Extreme Beauty: Aesthetics, Politics, Death. Edited by James Swearingen and Joanne Cutting-Gray (London and New York: Continuum Books, 2003).

APL Website

The APL website includes details concerning upcoming conferences, past events, submission forms, and services provided by the APL. All of the most current information, arrangements for lodging, travel, and related concerns in connection with APL conferences is posted as soon as it is available. Both past and current conference programs are also accessible from the website.

Organization

The Association for Philosophy and Literature is organized by the Executive Committee: Gary Aylesworth, Peter Gratton, John W P Phillips (Chair) and Gertrude Postl

Philosophy organizations
International learned societies
Organizations established in 1976
International organizations based in the United States